Akshdeep Deependra Nath (born 10 May 1993) is an Indian cricketer who plays for Uttar Pradesh in Indian domestic cricket. He is a right-hand batsman and occasional right arm medium pace bowler. He was the vice-captain of the India Under-19 cricket team that won the 2012 ICC Under-19 Cricket World Cup in Australia.

He was the leading run-scorer for Uttar Pradesh in the 2017–18 Ranji Trophy, with 387 runs in five matches. He was also the leading run-scorer for Uttar Pradesh in the 2018–19 Vijay Hazare Trophy, with 293 runs in six matches.

In August 2019, he was named in the India Green team's squad for the 2019–20 Duleep Trophy.

IPL career
In February 2017, he was bought by the Gujarat Lions team for the 2017 Indian Premier League for 10 lakhs. In January 2018, he was bought by the Kings XI Punjab in the 2018 IPL auction. In December 2018, he was bought by the Royal Challengers Bangalore in the player auction for the 2019 Indian Premier League. He was released by the Royal Challengers Bangalore ahead of the 2020 IPL auction.

References

External links 

1993 births
Living people
Indian cricketers
Uttar Pradesh cricketers
Central Zone cricketers
Gujarat Lions cricketers